The Cordillera de Oncol (sometimes called Valdivian Coast Range) is a mountain range, located along the Pacific coast in southern Chile. It is part of the Chilean Coast Range System (Cordillera de la Costa). It was named for the city of Valdivia. The highest point of the range is Cerro Oncol, at 715 m.

Natural history
The Valdivian Coastal Range has about 1 million acres (4,000 km2) of Valdivian temperate rain forests habitat, approximately one-quarter of which are protected.

The region has long been geographically isolated, making it a haven for endemic species. Some of the rare species that inhabit the Valdivian Coastal Range include the pudu (the smallest deer in the world), the common degu, the marine otter, and the monito del monte, or mountain monkey (actually a marsupial).

See also
Chilean Coast Range
Cruces River
Punucapa
Valdivia
Valdivian Coastal Reserve

References

External links
Conservation efforts in the Valdivian Coastal Range

Mountain ranges of Chile
Chilean Coast Range
Landforms of Los Ríos Region
Valdivian temperate rainforest